Thulabharam is a 1968 Indian Malayalam-language film, directed by A. Vincent. It is based on the Kerala People's Arts Club play of the same name, written by Thoppil Bhasi. Thoppil Bhasi also adapted the play for the screen. The film had an ensemble cast including Prem Nazir, Sharada, Madhu, Sheela, Thikkurisi Sukumaran Nair and Adoor Bhasi. The film won two National Awards. The film was a major blockbuster and following the Malayalam version, the film was made in Tamil (Thulabharam), Telugu (Manushulu Marali) and Hindi (Samaj Ko Badal Dalo), with Sharada playing lead roles in all versions.

Plot 
Two close friends, Vijaya (Sharada) and Vatsala (Sheela) had to part ways after Vatsala's father, a lawyer loses a case of Vijaya's father and it results in the latter's death. Vijaya marries Ramu (Prem Nazir), a trade union leader against her will. Ramu leads a union strike and is killed when the agitation turns violent. Vijaya's life becomes miserable and she kills her starving children, but she is arrested before being able to commit suicide. In the end, she is given the death penalty by the prosecution, led by her former dear friend Vatsala, who had become a famous lawyer in the meantime.

Cast 

Prem Nazir as Ramu
Sharada as Vijaya
Madhu as Babu
Sheela as Valsala
Adoor Bhasi as Achuthan Nair
Thikkurissy Sukumaran Nair as R. K. Menon
Adoor Bhavani
Baby Rajani
Kaduvakulam Antony
N. Govindankutty
Nellikode Bhaskaran
Thoppil Krishna Pillai
KPAC Khan

Production 
Thulabharam is an adaptation of the Kerala People's Arts Club play of the same name, written by Thoppil Bhasi.

Soundtrack 
The music was composed by G. Devarajan and the lyrics were written by Vayalar Ramavarma.

Remakes 
The film's success prompted for three remakes with Sharada playing the same role in all versions. The Tamil film with the same name was made by Vincent himself with A. V. M. Rajan replacing Nazir. V. Madhusudhana Rao directed the Telugu and Hindi versions.

Awards 
The film won two awards at the 16th National Film Awards.

National Film Award for Second Best Feature Film
National Film Award for Best Actress – Sharada

Filmfare Awards South
Filmfare Award for Best Film - Malayalam won by Supriya Pictures (1968)

References

External links 

1968 films
1960s Malayalam-language films
Films with screenplays by Thoppil Bhasi
Films about poverty in India
Indian drama films
Indian films based on plays
Malayalam films remade in other languages
Films featuring a Best Actress National Award-winning performance
Second Best Feature Film National Film Award winners
Films directed by A. Vincent
1968 drama films